"D.O.A." is a song by Texas hard rock band Bloodrock released by Capitol Records in early 1971.

Synopsis
The song is sung from the perspective of a man who has, temporarily, survived a mid-air collision. In his dying words, he describes in graphic detail what he remembered of the collision and his current condition: his arms have been severed, his co-pilot is already lifeless beside him, blood is rapidly leaving his body and pooling underneath him, and a paramedic indicates that no medical intervention can save him from imminent death. Ambulance sirens are heard at several points in the song; at the end, the music slows down and drops in key, simulating the narrator's loss of consciousness and death.

The initials D.O.A. stand for dead on arrival.

Background
The motivation for writing this song was explained in 2005 by guitarist Lee Pickens. “When I was 17, I wanted to be an airline pilot,” Pickens said. “I had just gotten out of this airplane with a friend of mine, at this little airport, and I watched him take off. He went about 200 feet in the air, rolled and crashed.” The band decided to write a song around the incident and include it on their second album.

Chart performance
The version of "D.O.A." released as a single is roughly half the length of the long album version found on Bloodrock 2.
In March 1971, many US radio stations and high schools banned "D.O.A.". Despite a lack of airplay, the single still reached number 36 on the Billboard chart.

The song was later included in a compilation album entitled Death, Glory and Retribution in 1985 that consisted of death, protest and "answer" songs by various artists.

Track listing
 "D.O.A." - 4:32 (single version)
 "Children's Heritage" - 3:31

Cover versions
 Manilla Road on The Courts of Chaos
 The Fuzztones on Monster A-Go-Go
 Virgin Steele on Nocturnes of Hellfire & Damnation (The Samhain Suite bonus CD)

References

American rock songs
1971 singles
Capitol Records singles
1970 songs